Diego Silva may refer to:

Diego Costa Silva (born 1979), Brazilian football goalkeeper
Diego Pelicles da Silva (born 1982), Brazilian footballer
Diego Silva (footballer, born 1983), Chilean football defender for Deportes Recoleta
Diego da Silva (footballer born 1985), Brazilian former footballer forward
Diego Silva (footballer, born 1987), Uruguayan football forward for See Khwae City	
Diego Martins da Silva (born 1989), Portuguese football goalkeeper
Diego Silva (footballer, born 1989), Brazilian football defensive midfielder for Marcílio Dias
Diego Silva (footballer, born 1990), Brazilian football forward
Diego Silva (footballer, born 1993), Brazilian football centre-back
Diego Silva (soccer, born 1997), American former soccer midfielder